Whistling Bullets is a 1937 American Western film directed by John English and written by Joseph O'Donnell. The film stars Kermit Maynard, Harley Wood, Maston Williams, Karl Hackett, Jack Ingram, Bruce Mitchell and James Sheridan. The film was released on May 3, 1937, by Ambassador Pictures.

Plot

Cast           
Kermit Maynard as Larry Graham
Harley Wood as Anita Saunders 
Maston Williams as Ace Beldon
Karl Hackett as Dave Stone
Jack Ingram as Tim Raymond
Bruce Mitchell as Captain John Saunders
James Sheridan as Sam
Cliff Parkinson as Bart 
Cherokee Alcorn as Karl

References

External links
 

1937 films
American Western (genre) films
1937 Western (genre) films
Films directed by John English
Films based on works by James Oliver Curwood
American black-and-white films
1930s English-language films
1930s American films